TFO is a Canadian French language educational television channel and media organization serving the province of Ontario. It is owned by the Ontario French-language Educational Communications Authority (OTELFO), a Crown corporation owned by the Government of Ontario and operating as Groupe Média TFO. It is the only French-language television service in Canada that operates entirely outside Quebec. The network airs cultural programming, including blocks of French-language children's programs, along with original series, documentaries, and films.

The network was first established in 1985 as La Chaîne Française, a spin-off of the provincial English-language public broadcaster TVO, later re-branding as TFO in 1995. The network operated under the auspices of TVO until 2007, when it was spun off into an autonomous agency.

TFO is available on multichannel television providers throughout Ontario; all cable and IPTV providers in the province are required to carry it on their basic tier. TFO is also carried nationally on the Bell Satellite TV and Shaw Direct satellite television services.  The network previously broadcast over-the-air in some communities in Eastern and Northern Ontario with significant Franco-Ontarian populations; these transmitters ceased operations in 2012.

History
When TVO (then known as TVOntario) launched in 1970, it aired French-language programming on Sundays from noon until sign-off.  By the 1980s, the provincial government concluded that a separate francophone educational network was needed to prevent the "ghettoization" of the Franco-Ontarian community.

In 1985, the Ontario Ministry of Municipal and Cultural Affairs, together with Communications Canada, approved the creation of an Ontario-based French-language educational television network. At the time, the only portions of Ontario with access to a dedicated francophone educational television service were the National Capital Region and the Ottawa Valley, which were served by Radio-Québec outlet CIVO-TV in Hull. In 1986, the new network received its broadcast licence from the Canadian Radio-television and Telecommunications Commission (CRTC). On January 1, 1987, this network was officially launched by the Ontario Educational Communications Authority under the name La Chaîne Française (primarily known on-air as La Chaîne). In 1995, La Chaîne was renamed TFO (short for Télévision française de l'Ontario). The company would remain a part of TVO until 2007, when it was transferred to the Ontario French-language Educational Communications Authority, a separate crown corporation. It is the only French-language television broadcaster in Canada headquartered outside Quebec.

For the first decade of La Chaîne's operations, TVO's existing practice of broadcasting in French on Sundays continued, and La Chaîne aired English-language programming during the same time block. This was because La Chaîne was only available on cable at first, and the government wanted to ensure that Franco-Ontarian viewers without cable still had access to a block of French-language programming, while making English TVO programs available on La Chaîne for those who wanted them. As transmitters were added in a number of French-speaking communities, the practice was discontinued in the mid-1990s.

In addition to being carried throughout Ontario on cable and via over-the-air transmitters in some communities, in October 1997 TFO began broadcasting in New Brunswick via select cable companies in that province. New Brunswick was the first jurisdiction other than Ontario where TFO was offered. TFO would later be broadcast into parts of Quebec as well. In 1998, the station began broadcasting nationally via both national satellite companies, Bell ExpressVu and Star Choice, now known as Bell Satellite TV and Shaw Direct, respectively. In August 2008, Star Choice removed TFO from its lineup. In 1999, TFO's parent company at the time, The Ontario Educational Communications Authority, applied to the CRTC for mandatory carriage of TFO in the province of Quebec, in addition to a carriage fee, which other over-the-air services do not receive. However, the CRTC denied its application in March 2000. That year Jacques Bensimon, co-founder of the network and managing director of the network since 1986 (before it became its own channel), resigned from the position. Over his tenure he formed relationships between TFO and French-language networks in Europe, in order to share content. This included co-producing content with the BBC, France 2 and Channel 4 in the UK.
 

As part of a restructuring of TVO announced by the McGuinty government on June 29, 2006, TFO was taken over by a new, separate provincial Crown corporation, the Ontario French-Language Educational Communications Authority (Office des télécommunications éducatives de langue française de l’Ontario or OTÉLFO) in 2007, with separate management and its own budget. Although the licence transfer was not officially approved by the CRTC until June 28, 2007, TFO nonetheless announced its autonomy from TVO effective April 1. GroupeMédia TFO is funded mainly by the Government of Ontario, through the Ministry of Education, with an annual budget of $31 million.  Additional contributions have been made by the Government of Manitoba since the channel was added to cable services in that province in 2010.

In 2010, then TFO CEO Claudette Paquin was awarded the Commissioner of Official Language's Award of Excellence – Promotion of Linguistic Duality for her leadership in TFO's transition to more autonomy, and the work the channel has done to promote the development of the Franco-Ontarian community.

In April 2016, TFO announced that it had established a partnership with Louisiana Public Broadcasting to syndicate 14 hours per-week of French-language children's programming to the broadcaster's LPB2 service. The partnership is designed to appeal to Louisiana's strong French heritage and French immersion programs.

Television and web programming
At its launch in 1987, the channel's programming schedule included both original programming produced by the network, such as the educational comedy series 17, rue Laurier, the health series La santé contagieuse and the newsmagazine series M.E.M.O., and acquired programming from both Quebec and France, such as the children's series Passe-Partout and L'île aux enfants and the talk show Apostrophes. It also aired a francophone dub of the 1970s English Canadian children's series Matt and Jenny, under the title La route de l'amitié.

Main shows
GroupeMédia TFO broadcasts educational and cultural content for all of its audiences (children, youth, and adults). Programs that TFO produces include Mini TFO (for pre-school children), Mégallô (for children ages 9 to 12), RelieF (a political, social, and cultural program aired live Monday through Thursday), the sitcom Météo+, and Ruby TFO, a Web/TV magazine for women. TFO's prime time programming includes documentaries and dramatic series, along with unique French-language film programming, including feature-length art films and films from around the world. CinéTFO is the network's nightly showing of French-language cinema.

Music programming
BRBR is another music show, featuring reviews, interviews, and performances from French-speaking artists. The concerts take place in downtown Toronto and Montreal in front of live crowds. The show has been nominated for several Gemini Awards. In October 2013 BRBR teamed with Deezer to launch an online radio station dedicated to the music of Francophone Canadians. Other music programming includes the series Behind the Scenes, which shows the backstage, studio, and other parts of the music industry generally hidden from the public eye. TFO also broadcasts the singing competition reality show JAM.

Mini TFO
Mini TFO provides YouTube channels for young children, receiving 25 million views between its launch and October 2014 - the second most views of any children's channel in the world. TFO has also focused on mobile broadcasting, developing several apps for children's use. Other apps are developed to provide parents with a rating and research mechanism when deciding between programming and apps developed for child viewers or educational use - such as EduLulu. In 2013 Mini TFO also opened the Mini TFO Centre for Early Childhood Education at Collège Boréal. The channel also sponsors live tours of its affiliated acts, specifically in remote areas of Ontario. Children's programming on TFO is integrated into its web programming, which includes mobile applications designed for child development. TFO also produces reality television shows featuring kids, including the Amazing Race style series Les Jumelles where local kids compete against each other in teams of two.

Cartoons
Cartoons broadcast on TFO include:
64, rue du Zoo aka 64 Zoo Lane
Adibou (listed as Adibou: aventure dans le corps humain on guides)
Les aventures d'Olive l'autruche
Bande de Sportifs
Bing
Bitz et BobBookabooBouba aka Jacky and JillCaillouCharlie et LolaChristopher, Josée et LexieLe club des cinq: nouvelles enquetesDimitriDinopawsDinosaur TrainDipdapDoodlebooLes DoozersDrôles de petites bêtesErnest et CelestineGribouilleGuess How Much I Love YouGuess with JessKiokaLouieLulu ZipadooMaXiMaya l'abeilleMiniversMiss SpiderMoukLes Mystères d'AlfredPeg et ChatLa petite école d'HélènePetz ClubPing et ses amisPinky Dinky DooLes PopilousPoppy CatLe RanchLa Rêve de ChamplainRob le RobotRuff-Ruff, Tweet and DaveSagwa, les aventures de la chat SiamoiseThe Secret World of Benjamin BearSOS creatures!Sports BandStella et SachaSubway Surfers: Le serie d'animation aka Subway Surfers: The Animated SeriesTib et TatoumTip the MouseTractor TomLe village de DanyWendyWubby SchoolZack and QuackZoubi DoubiOther programming
 
TFO also broadcasts the news and culture show TFO 360, hosted by Linda Godin, who has also moderated debates between national party leaders in Canada. Plein les Vues serves as TFO's entertainment news show. On the web, it runs SOS Devoirs, a series of web properties designed to help children with their homework used by 90,000 students each year. The TFO website also provides curriculum support, pedagogical guides, and 4,000 different educational programs (1600 available for free). TFO itself has training programs to teach educators how to use video materials in the classroom, attended by 2,000 teachers per year. TFO is Canada's largest producer and distributor of French-language educational products.

Former transmitters
From 1989 to 2012, TFO operated several over-the-air transmitters in predominantly francophone areas of Eastern and Northern Ontario. These transmitters had the callsign CHLF-TV, followed by a number to denote their status as rebroadcasters. Besides Sudbury, Hawkesbury, Temiskaming Shores and Pembroke, TFO otherwise transmitted over the air mainly in isolated portions of Northern Ontario without access to cable.

As part of the transfer of TFO to its own management in 2007, the transmitters in Sultan, Oba and Jogues were taken out of service. On July 31, 2012, TFO shut down its transmitters in Sudbury, Hawkesbury, Pembroke and Lac-Sainte-Thérèse, as TVO, which owned the towers, was shutting down and decommissioning all its analog transmitters on that day. As of December 2012, the station no longer has any over-the-air transmitters as evidenced by the disappearance from Industry Canada's TV spectrum database of TFO's over-the-air transmitters.

References

External links
TFO 
CHLF-TV history - Canadian Communication Foundation
 (data for all TFO repeaters)''

 
Television channels and stations established in 1987
1987 establishments in Ontario
Ontario government departments and agencies
French-language television networks in Canada
Educational television networks in Canada
French-language television stations in Ontario